Wade Schalles is an American folkstyle and freestyle wrestler. In college, he represented Clarion University of Pennsylvania. He is also an accomplished black belt judoka and samboist, winning national championships in both disciplines. He created several unique wrestling techniques, including the Spladle, Lazy Man Cradle, and the Clemson Roll. In 1991, Schalles was inducted into the National Wrestling Hall of Fame as a Distinguished Member.

Education 
Schalles graduated from Hollidaysburg High School in Hollidaysburg, Pennsylvania in 1969, and then went on to graduate from Clarion University of Pennsylvvania with a secondary education degree in 1974.

College wrestling
Schalles wrestled at Clarion from 1970–1974. He was an NCAA Division I champion in 1972 and 1973, winning the outstanding wrestler award in 1972.

Coaching career
He served as an assistant coach at Arizona State (1976), assistant coach at South Dakota State (1977), Head Coach at Clemson (1978–83), and Head Coach Old Dominion (1983–85). 

In 2014, he became head coach of Scientific Wrestling.

References

External links
 Eagle Hawk Academy
 Pin & Submit

1951 births
Living people
American wrestlers
American male sport wrestlers
American male judoka
American sambo practitioners
Clarion University of Pennsylvania alumni
Clarion Golden Eagles wrestlers